Earl of Rosse is a title that has been created twice in the Peerage of Ireland, both times for the Parsons family. "Rosse" refers to New Ross in County Wexford.

History 
The Parsons were originally an English family from Dishworth (Diseworth) Grange in Leicestershire; there having been five brothers who settled in Ireland during the late 16th century.  One of the brothers, William Parsons, was created a Baronet in the Baronetage of Ireland of Bellamont in the County of Dublin in 1620 by James VI & I. The third Baronet was created Viscount Rosse in the Peerage of Ireland in 1681, and the second Viscount was created Earl of Rosse in the Peerage of Ireland in 1718; these titles of the first creation became extinct on the death of the second Earl in 1764.

Sir Lawrence Parsons, the younger brother of Sir William Parsons, 1st Baronet, settled in Birr, King's County, later known as Parsonstown, and was the ancestor of the younger (Birr) branch of the family. His grandson Laurence Parsons was created a Baronet, of Birr Castle in King's County, in the Baronetage of Ireland in 1677, but was attainted by King James II's Parliament in 1689 and sentenced to death. The sentence was never carried out, however. His great-grandson, the third Baronet, and great-great-grandson, the fourth Baronet, both represented King's County in the Irish House of Commons. The latter's half-brother Laurence Harman Parsons was in 1792 raised to the Peerage of Ireland as Baron Oxmantown, with remainder to his nephew Sir Lawrence Parsons, 5th Baronet, who had succeeded his father the fourth Baronet in 1791.

In 1795 he was made Viscount Oxmantown in the Peerage of Ireland, with normal remainder to the heirs male of his body, and in 1806 he was even further honoured when he was created Earl of Rosse in the Peerage of Ireland, with similar remainder as for the barony. Lord Rosse sat from 1800 to 1807 as one of the original Irish Representative Peers in the British House of Lords. On his death in 1807 the viscountcy became extinct while he was succeeded in the barony and earldom according to the special remainders by his aforementioned nephew, the 5th Baronet. The latter represented King's County in the British House of Commons and sat in the House of Lords as an Irish Representative Peer between 1809 and 1841.

The 2nd Earl's son, the 3rd Earl, was a well-known astronomer and famous for his construction of the giant telescope the Leviathan of Parsonstown at his seat Birr Castle. Lord Rosse also sat as Member of Parliament for King's County, was an Irish Representative Peer from 1845 to 1867 – years during which millions of the Irish population died from starvation or emigrated.  He was one of the very few who foresaw the consequences of the potato blight and tried to alert the British authorities. He was Lord Lieutenant of King's County from 1831 to 1867 and President of the Royal Society from 1849 to 1854. He was succeeded by his son, the fourth Earl. He was an Irish Representative Peer between 1868 and 1908 and Lord Lieutenant of King's County between 1892 and 1908. His son, the fifth Earl, was an Irish Representative Peer from 1911 to 1918 and Lord-Lieutenant of King's County from 1908 to 1918. Lord Rosse fought in the First World War and died from wounds received in action in 1918.  the titles are held by his grandson, the seventh Earl, who succeeded his father in 1979.

When the present Earl worked for the United Nations Development Programme, he did not use his title, preferring to be known by his family surname of Parsons.

The family seat is Birr Castle, near Birr, County Offaly.

Parsons Baronets, of Bellamont (1620) 
Sir William Parsons, 1st Baronet of Bellamont (1570–1650)
Sir William Parsons, 2nd Baronet of Bellamont (died 1658) grandson of the first baronet
Richard Parsons, 2nd Baronet of Bellamont (–1703) (created Viscount Rosse in 1681)

Viscounts Rosse (1681) 
Richard Parsons, 1st Viscount Rosse (–1703)
Richard Parsons, 2nd Viscount Rosse (died 1741) (created Earl of Rosse in 1718)

Earls of Rosse, First Creation (1718) 
Richard Parsons, 1st Earl of Rosse (died 1741)
Richard Parsons, 2nd Earl of Rosse (–1764)

Parsons Baronets, of Birr Castle (1677)
Sir Laurence Parsons, 1st Baronet (–1698)
Sir William Parsons, 2nd Baronet (died 1741)
Sir Laurence Parsons, 3rd Baronet (1707–1756)
Sir William Parsons, 4th Baronet (1731–1791)
Sir Laurence Parsons, 5th Baronet (1758–1841) (succeeded as Earl of Rosse in 1807)

Earls of Rosse, Second Creation (1806) 
Laurence Harman Parsons, 1st Earl of Rosse (1749–1807)
Lawrence Parsons, 2nd Earl of Rosse (1758–1841)
William Parsons, 3rd Earl of Rosse (1800–1867)
Lawrence Parsons, 4th Earl of Rosse (1840–1908)
William Edward Parsons, 5th Earl of Rosse (1873–1918)
Lawrence Michael Harvey Parsons, 6th Earl of Rosse (1906–1979)
William Clere Leonard Brendan Parsons, 7th Earl of Rosse (born 1936)

The heir apparent is the present holder's son, Lawrence Patrick Parsons, Lord Oxmantown (born 1969).
The heir apparent's heir apparent is his son, the Hon. William Charles Yufan Parsons (born 2008).

Line of Succession 

 James Parsons
  Sir William Parsons of Bellamont, 1st Baronet (d. c. 1649/50)
 Richard Parsons (d. a. 1642)
  Sir William Parsons, 2nd Baronet (d. 1658)
  Richard Parsons, 1st Viscount Rosse (c. 1656—1702/3) (remainder to great-grandfather)
  Richard Parsons, 1st Earl of Rosse (d. 1741)
  Richard Parsons, 2nd Earl of Rosse (b. 1718—1764)
 Sir Laurence Parsons (d. 1628)
 William Parsons (d. 1653)
  Sir Laurence Parsons, of Birr Castle, 1st Baronet (c. 1637—1698)
  Sir William Parsons, 2nd Baronet (d. 1740/1)
 William Parsons (d. bef. 1740)
  Sir Laurence Parsons, 3rd Baronet (1707—1756)
  Sir William Parsons, 4th Baronet (1731—1791)
  Laurence Parsons, 2nd Earl of Rosse (1758—1841) Rep. peer from 1809, taking the Earl of Normanton's room; the Earl of Caledon followed.
  William Parsons, 3rd Earl of Rosse (1800—1867) Rep. peer from 1845, taking the Earl of Limerick's room; Lord Dunboyne followed.
  Lawrence Parsons, 4th Earl of Rosse (1840—1908) Rep. peer from 1868, taking Lord Farnham's room; Lord Ashtown followed.
  William Edward Parsons, 5th Earl of Rosse (1873—1918) Rep. peer from 1911, taking the 3rd Lord Bellew's room; Lord Charlemont followed.
  Laurence Michael Harvey Parsons, 6th Earl of Rosse (1906—1979)
  William Clere Leonard Brendan Parsons, 7th Earl of Rosse (b. 1936)
 (1) Lawrence Patrick Parsons, Lord Oxmantown (b. 1969)
 (2) Hon. William Charles Parsons (b. 2008)
 (3) Hon. Michael John Finn Parsons (b. 1981)
 Hon. Desmond Oliver Martin Parsons (1938—2010)
 (4) Rupert Alexander Michael Parsons (b. 1966)
 (5) Harry Oliver Parsons (b. 2000)
 (6) Desmond Edward Richard Parsons (b. 1968)
 Hon. Richard Clere Parsons (1851—1923)
 Arthur David Clere Parsons (1881—1955)
 Arthur Christopher Parsons (1919—1999)
 (7) Sir John Christopher Parsons (b. 1946)
 (8) Michael Reginald Parsons (b. 1983)
 (9) David Guy Parsons (b. 1985)
 (10) Reginald John Vernon Parsons (b. 2014)
 Rev. Canon Richard Edward Parsons (1888—1971)
 Reverend Desmond John Parsons (1925—2014)
 (11) Benedict Desmond Drummond Parsons (b. 1969)
 Hon. Laurence Parsons (1805—1894)
 Reverend Randolph Cecil Parsons (1852—1941)
 John Cecil Lawrence Parsons (1905—1978)
 (12) Michael Charles Parsons (b. 1950)
  Laurence Harman Parsons, 1st Earl of Rosse (1749—1807) Rep. peer from 1801, the Earl of Kingston followed.

See also 
Sir Charles Algernon Parsons

Notes

References 
Kidd, Charles, Williamson, David (editors). Debrett's Peerage and Baronetage (1990 edition). New York: St Martin's Press, 1990, 
Malcomson, A.P.W. (editor), Calendar of the Rosse Papers (2008). Dublin: Irish Manuscripts Commission .

History of the Parsons family

External links 
Birr Castle

Noble titles created in 1806
Earldoms in the Peerage of Ireland
Noble titles created in 1718
Extinct earldoms in the Peerage of Ireland
People from Birr, County Offaly
Peerages created with special remainders
1718 establishments in Ireland